Draba splendens is a species of flowering plant in the family Brassicaceae. It is found only in Ecuador. Its natural habitats are subtropical or tropical high-altitude grassland and rocky areas. It is threatened by habitat loss.

References

splendens
Flora of Ecuador
Vulnerable plants
Taxonomy articles created by Polbot